The 2016 Valparaiso Crusaders football team represented Valparaiso University in the 2016 NCAA Division I FCS football season. They were led by third-year head coach Dave Cecchini and played their home games at Brown Field. They were members of the Pioneer Football League. They finished the season 4–7, 3–5 in PFL play to finish in a two-way tie for seventh place.

Schedule

Source: Schedule

Game summaries

at Illinois State

at Sacred Heart

Trinity International

Davidson

at Morehead State

Drake

at Stetson

San Diego

Butler

at Dayton

Jacksonville

References

Valparaiso
Valparaiso Beacons football seasons
Valparaiso Crusaders football